Julio César Salazar Enríquez (born 8 July 1993) is a Mexican racewalker. He competed in the 20 kilometres walk event at the 2015 World Championships in Athletics in Beijing, China and at the 2015 Pan American Games in Toronto, Canada. In 2019, he competed in the men's 20 kilometres walk at the 2019 World Athletics Championships held in Doha, Qatar. He finished in 20th place.

See also
 Mexico at the 2015 World Championships in Athletics

References

1993 births
Living people
Mexican male racewalkers
Sportspeople from Chihuahua (state)
People from Chihuahua City
World Athletics Championships athletes for Mexico
Pan American Games competitors for Mexico
Athletes (track and field) at the 2015 Pan American Games
Athletes (track and field) at the 2016 Summer Olympics
Olympic athletes of Mexico
Universiade medalists in athletics (track and field)
Universiade silver medalists for Mexico
Medalists at the 2017 Summer Universiade
21st-century Mexican people